Central Arizona College (CAC) is a public community college near Coolidge, Arizona. CAC serves the population of Pinal County.

History and campus 
Since 1969, Central Arizona College has been serving and educating the communities of Pinal County.  CAC provides educational, economic, cultural, and personal growth opportunities.

With five campuses and three centers located throughout the county, campuses include: Signal Peak, located in Coolidge, Arizona, Aravaipa, located in Winkelman, Arizona, Superstition Mountain, located in Apache Junction, Arizona, Maricopa, located in Maricopa, Arizona, and San Tan, located in San Tan Valley, Arizona. The three centers include The Casa Grande and Corporate Centers, located in Casa Grande, Arizona and the Florence Center, located in Florence, Arizona.

Organization and administration 
Dr. Jacquelyn Elliott became President/CEO of Central Arizona College on July 1, 2016.

Academics 
The college offers an array of academic degrees and certificates, career training and personal enrichment classes. Online and university transfer courses along with continuing education classes and workshops are also offered, providing learning opportunities for community members.

Sports 
The mascot for Central Arizona is the Vaquero/Vaquera for women's teams (vaquero/a is Spanish for cowboy).  Their colors are gold and green.  They participate in the National Junior College Athletic Association, the Arizona Community College Athletic Conference, and the Western States Football League. CAC competes in Division 1 in the NJCAA.  The Vaqueros have won 39 National Titles. CAC fields 10 intercollegiate teams, five for men and five for women.  Men's sports at Central Arizona College include baseball, basketball, cross country, track and field and rodeo. The Vaqueras women compete in basketball, softball, and cross country, track and field and rodeo.

Notable alumni 
 Matt Brase, basketball coach
 Brent Gaff, New York Mets (MLB baseball player)
 Scott Hairston, Washington Nationals (MLB baseball player)
 Rich Harden, former MLB baseball player
 Mike Hrabak, Rain or Shine Elasto Painters (of the Philippine Basketball Association)
 Zepherinus Joseph, runner
 Ian Kinsler, Israeli-American MLB baseball player; 4-time All Star
 Todd Kohlhepp, convicted serial killer
 Bob Lacey, MLB baseball player
Obed Mutanya, distance runner
 Matt Pagnozzi, former MLB baseball player
 Tom Pagnozzi, former MLB baseball player; All Star
 Bridget Pettis, Phoenix Mercury (former WNBA basketball player)
 Donald Sanford (American-Israeli Olympic sprinter)
 TJ Shope, member of the Arizona House of Representatives
 Josh Spence, Miami Marlins (former MLB baseball player)
 Dan Wheeler, former MLB baseball player

References

External links 
 Official website
 Official athletics website

 
Buildings and structures in Pinal County, Arizona
Community colleges in Arizona
Education in Pinal County, Arizona
Educational institutions established in 1969
1969 establishments in Arizona